Milford Township is one of the twelve townships of Defiance County, Ohio, United States. The 2010 census found 1,081 people in the township.

Geography
Located in the northwestern corner of the county along the Indiana line, it borders the following townships:
St. Joseph Township, Williams County - north
Center Township, Williams County - northeast corner
Farmer Township - east
Mark Township - southeast corner
Hicksville Township - south
Newville Township, DeKalb County, Indiana - southwest
Stafford Township, DeKalb County, Indiana - west

No municipalities are located in Milford Township.

Name and history
Milford Township was established in 1837. Statewide, other Milford Townships are located in Butler and Knox counties.

Government
The township is governed by a three-member board of trustees, who are elected in November of odd-numbered years to a four-year term beginning on the following January 1. Two are elected in the year after the presidential election and one is elected in the year before it. There is also an elected township fiscal officer, who serves a four-year term beginning on April 1 of the year after the election, which is held in November of the year before the presidential election. Vacancies in the fiscal officership or on the board of trustees is filled by the remaining trustees.

Transportation
Two significant highways in Milford Township are State Route 49, which travels from north to south, and State Route 249, which travels from east to west.  They meet in the center of the township.

References

External links
County website

Townships in Defiance County, Ohio
Townships in Ohio